Çınarlı is a village in Mut district of Mersin Province, Turkey. It is situated on the Taurus Mountains to the east of Mut. The population of the village was 164 as of 2012.

References

Villages in Mut District